Sphagnum fallax, the flat-topped bogmoss, is a moss species in the genus Sphagnum

References

External links

Flora of Bulgaria
fallax